Gull Island is a small island located at , 8 km (5 miles) off shore from Prudhoe Bay, Alaska, in the Beaufort Sea.  In plan view it is shaped somewhat like the capital letter "L", with a length of approximately 300 m, and is about 30 m wide along much of its length.  In some satellite images it appears like a small crescent, due to its low topographic prominence above sea level.  Little more than a gravel pad, it is a roosting place for seagulls in the summertime.  It was also the site of petroleum exploration as part of the larger Prudhoe Bay Oil Field exploration in the 1960s and 1970s.

Others 
There are a number of other small islands in state of Alaska that are named "Gull Island", notably one near Homer that is a nesting site for common murres.

References

Islands of Alaska
Islands of North Slope Borough, Alaska
Islands of the Beaufort Sea